Robert Louis Reynolds (January 22, 1939 – October 10, 1996) was an American football offensive tackle. He was a 2nd round selection (17th overall pick) in the 1963 NFL Draft by the St. Louis Cardinals out of Bowling Green State University. Reynolds played 12 seasons in the NFL for the St. Louis Cardinals (1963–1971, 1973) and the New England Patriots (1972–1973).

References

External links

NFL.com player page

1939 births
1996 deaths
Players of American football from Nashville, Tennessee
American football offensive tackles
Bowling Green Falcons football players
St. Louis Cardinals (football) players
New England Patriots players
Eastern Conference Pro Bowl players